Ryan Buggle (born January 31, 2010) is an American actor and dancer from Matawan, New Jersey. He is best known for playing Noah Benson on Law & Order: Special Victims Unit.

Early life 
Ryan Buggle was born on January 31, 2010, in New Jersey. He began studying dance at the age of 5, and he continues to train and compete.

Career 
Buggle made his acting debut in 2013 in a Toys "R" Us commercial.

In 2017, Buggle joined the cast of Law & Order: Special Victims Unit, taking over the role of Noah Benson, the adopted son of Captain Olivia Benson.  He has also appeared twice on spinoff series Law & Order: Organized Crime. Due to his love and talent for dance, Ryan petitioned the writers to incorporate this into the show.

In 2017, Ryan was featured as part of the cast of Radio City Music Hall Christmas Spectacular.

Ryan made his Broadway debut in 2019, as part of the cast of The Inheritance.  He played the role until 2020, which the Broadway play shuttered due to the COVID-19 pandemic.

Ryan made two guest appearances in the Netflix series Mindhunter.  In 2020, Ryan was featured in the film Lazy Susan, written by and starring Sean Hayes.

Filmography

Television

Stage

References

External links 
 
 

2010 births
Living people
American male child actors
American male film actors
American male ballet dancers
Male actors from New Jersey
People from Matawan, New Jersey